Ralph Curry Lenney (11 January 1895 – 10 November 1971) was an English footballer who played as a forward. During his career, he played professionally for West Bromwich Albion, Wrexham and Carlisle United.

References

1895 births
1971 deaths
West Bromwich Albion F.C. players
Wrexham A.F.C. players
Carlisle United F.C. players
Association football forwards
English footballers